Anuchit Ngrnbukkol (born 23 July 1993) is a Thai professional footballer who plays as a midfielder for Thai League 2 club Sukhothai.

References

External links

1993 births
Living people
Anuchit Ngrnbukkol
Anuchit Ngrnbukkol
Association football midfielders
Anuchit Ngrnbukkol
Anuchit Ngrnbukkol